Seering John Matthews OBE was the fifth Bishop of Carpentaria.

He was born on 26 March 1900, educated at St John's College, Auckland and Moore Theological College and ordained in 1926. After a curacy at Christ Church St Laurence, Sydney he was Priest in charge at St Mary's Fitzroy, Melbourne then Vicar of St James', Calcutta. From 1938 to 1942 he was Principal of the Bishop Westcott Boys' School in Namkum then a Royal Air Force Chaplain. After World War II he was Vicar of St Bartholomew's, Ipswich then Archdeacon of Rockhampton before his ordination to the episcopate. He died in 1978.

References

1900 births
Anglican archdeacons in Australia
Anglican bishops of Carpentaria
20th-century Anglican bishops in Australia
Officers of the Order of the British Empire
1978 deaths
Australian military chaplains
Royal Air Force chaplains
World War II chaplains
Heads of schools in India